Gaysorn Village (previously Gaysorn Plaza) is a building complex in the Ratchaprasong area of Bangkok. It also includes the Gaysorn Tower, an office tower block, and the Amarin Plaza shopping centre.

The shopping mall building has five levels with more than 100 shops over an area of 12,600 square metres. The basement has parking for 416 cars, doorman and valet parking service. Gaysorn is managed by Gaysorn Land Asset Management Co., Ltd., a partnership between by Gaysorn Group & Hongkong Land Limited. Gaysorn Shopping Centre is a part of Ratchaprasong Shopping district in Bangkok.

Transportation
 BTS Skytrain Sukhumvit Line - Gaysorn has a direct skybridge link on its second floor to Chit Lom Station, InterContinental Hotel, Grand Hyatt Erawan Bangkok, Holiday Inn, Erawan Bangkok, Amarin Plaza and to CentralWorld Plaza.

References

External links
 

Shopping malls in Bangkok
Pathum Wan district